Kai Rimmel (born 23 November 1952 in Viljandi) is an Estonian politician. She has been a member of the XIV Riigikogu.

In 1977 she graduated from Tallinn University of Technology in conservation technology.

From 1977 to 1986 she was an engineer-technologist in Tallinn Model Poultry Factory/AS Tallegg.

Since 2006 she is a member of Conservative People's Party of Estonia.

References

1952 births
Living people
Conservative People's Party of Estonia politicians
Members of the Riigikogu, 2019–2023
Women members of the Riigikogu
Tallinn University of Technology alumni
People from Viljandi
21st-century Estonian women politicians